The following radio stations broadcast on FM frequency 97.0 MHz:

China 
 CNR The Voice of China in Taiyuan

Ireland
 RTÉ 2fm (Clermont Carn)

Malaysia
 TraXX FM in Besut, Terengganu

Turkey
Radyo Fenerbahçe in Istanbul, Bursa, Kocaeli, and Sakarya
Radyo 3 in Çanakkale and Tekirdağ

United Kingdom
Heart Kent in Dover
Heart Thames Valley in Reading
Heart West in Exeter
Heart South West in Plymouth
Free Radio in Coventry
Clyde 1 in Vale of Leven
Westsound in Dumfries
Nevis Radio in Glencoe

References

Lists of radio stations by frequency